Paul Stanley Iacono (born September 7, 1988) is an American actor. He is best known for portraying RJ Berger in the MTV scripted series The Hard Times of RJ Berger.

Early years
Iacono was born in Secaucus, New Jersey, to Italian American parents Michele and Anthony Iacono, a town administrator. He has a younger brother, who works as DJ in New Jersey, and a sister, from his Dad’s second marriage. Iacono went to Professional Performing Arts School in New York, with friend and Fame co-star Paul McGill. He graduated in 2006.

At eight years old, Iacono was diagnosed with acute lymphoblastic leukemia. He soon began receiving chemotherapy treatments and has been in remission since he was eleven years old.

Career
A graduate of NYC's Professional Performing Arts School, Iacono is best known for his portrayal of the title character on MTV's, The Hard Times of RJ Berger.

Paul first gained wide notice for his numerous appearances on TV's The Rosie O'Donnell Show after Rosie O'Donnell discovered his unique talents for impersonating Frank Sinatra and Ethel Merman, at age 8.

Starting out as child actor in the NYC theater scene, Paul has appeared in over 100 theatrical productions. He has shared the stage with such greats as Mickey Rooney in The Wizard of Oz and Stephanie Mills in the original "Paper Mill Playhouse" production of Stephen Schwartz's Children of Eden. Iacono can be heard on the original cast recording. Other theatrical credits include Mame with Christine Ebersole, Noël Coward's Sail Away with Elaine Stritch and Marian Seldes, and John Guare's Landscape of the Body, with Lili Taylor and Sherie Rene Scott.

Paul's film career includes the MGM's remake of Fame, No God, No Master with David Strathairn, and Darren Stein's teen comedy, G.B.F.. Other films include Drew Barrymore's, Animal, Rhymes with Banana with Zosia Mamet and Judith Light, and "Unreachable by Conventional Means," with Alexandra Daddario and Tovah Feldshuh. According to Entertainment Weekly, co-star Megan Mullally gave Iacono high praise for his improvisational acting and singing skills.

Iacono appears in an Adidas commercial featuring rapper Bobby Ray "B.o.B" Simmons Jr and also appears in Bobby Ray's Music Video "Magic", featuring Rivers Cuomo.

As a creator, Paul wrote and produced the NY play, "Prince/Elizabeth", and is in development on his second pilot, "GIF'ted".

Personal life
Iacono is gay and a major LGBTQ activist, having publicly come out in Michael Musto's Village Voice Column in April 2012. He was named one of OUT Magazine's 100 most influential gay, lesbian, bisexual, or transgender people for 2013.

In an April 2012 interview with Michael Musto from The Village Voice, Iacono revealed that he is attracted to both men and women, but prefers men much more and identifies as a gay man and as bisexual. Iacono stated that "I am attracted to girls, I'm just attracted to guys much more."

Filmography

Film

Television

Stage

References

External links

1988 births
American gay actors
American male child actors
American male film actors
American male television actors
American people of Italian descent
LGBT people from New Jersey
Living people
Male actors from New Jersey
People from Secaucus, New Jersey